Hafiz Bashir Ahmed (born 1 August 1960 in Bilasipara, Assam) is an All India United Democratic Front politician from Assam. He was elected in Assam Legislative Assembly election in 2006, 2011, 2016 and 2021 from Bilasipara West constituency.

References

1960 births
Living people
All India United Democratic Front politicians
People from Dhubri district
Assam MLAs 2006–2011
Assam MLAs 2011–2016
Assam MLAs 2016–2021
Darul Uloom Deoband alumni
Gauhati University alumni